Gelu is a village of Satu Mare in Romania. It is named after the Romanian duke Gelou.

References

Districts of Satu Mare